Bog sedge is a vernacular name for any of the following plants:

Carex limosa
Carex magellanica subsp. irrigua (formerly Carex paupercula)
Kobresia